The 10.6x25mmR German Ordnance cartridge, also called the 10.6mm Reichsrevolver, the 10.6mm Service Ordnance, or the 10.55mm German cartridge, is a pistol cartridge designed by the then newly formed German Empire for their first two official service revolvers the M1879 & M1883 Reichsrevolvers. 

It is believed to have been influenced by, or developed from the .44 Russian cartridge, which had been developed by the American firearms manufacturer Smith & Wesson for the Armies of Imperial Russia.

History
When they were adopted by Imperial Germany, both the 10.6x25mmR German Ordnance cartridge and the Reichsrevolver had already been surpassed by more advanced developments already in use by other nations and empires of Europe and the Americas. The 10.6x25mm German Ordnance cartridge would be slowly phased out and replaced in German service by the modern 9×19mm Parabellum round with the adoption of the Pistole Parabellum 1908 (more commonly called the Luger pistol) in 1908, and would be used alongside its successor, the 9x19mm Parabellum, in World War I, and would see minimal use through the period of World War II, before finally being completely phased out.

References

1870s establishments in Germany
1945 disestablishments in Germany
Pistol and rifle cartridges
Military cartridges
Rimmed cartridges